Billy the Kid is a Western comic book series published by Charlton Comics, with stories of a fictional character based on the historical Billy the Kid. Taking over the numbering of a previous Western comic, Masked Raider, Billy the Kid was published from issues #9-153 (Nov. 1957 - March 1983). The Billy the Kid character made his first appearance in Masked Raider #6.

Regular backup features in the book included Bounty Hunter Shawn O'Meara, Tenderfoot Sheriff John Lind, Mr. Young Of The Boothill Gazette, and Apache Red.

Regular contributors to the title included writer Joe Gill, and artists Pat Boyette, José Delbo, Jack Keller, Sanho Kim, Rocke Mastroserio, Charles Nicholas, Warren Sattler, and Carl Wessler.

Publication history 
The book's first five issues (June 1955 - Aug. 1956) were titled Masked Raider (not to be confused with the Timely Comics character), starring a masked gunfighter and his pet golden eagle Talon. With issue #6 the book was titled Masked Raider Presents Billy the Kid. This title lasted three issues, through cover-date July 1957. With issue #9, the full cover title was Billy the Kid: Western Outlaw, lasting through issue #37.

Billy the Kid was twice put under publication hiatus, first between #121 and #122 (Jan.–Aug. 1977), and then from #123 to #124 (Nov. 1977–Feb. 1978). From that point the end of the run, Billy the Kid was a reprint title.

Recurring features 
 The Cheyenne Kid made appearances in issues #19, 117, 118, 127-129, 134, 135, and 138-141.
 Bounty Hunter (Shawn O'Meara) stories were featured in issues #66-78, 80, 81, 83, and 87.
 Fictional Doc Holliday stories appeared in issues #68, 77, and 86.
 Tenderfoot Sheriff John Lind appeared in issues #73, 85, 90, 93, 147, and 152.
 Mr. Young of The Boothill Gazette stories were featured in issues #88-98, 100, 102, and 104-110.
 Apache Red stories appeared in issues #112, 114-116, and 119-123.

References

External links 
 Charlton Spotlight: Charlton Characters & Features
 Billy the Kid cover gallery

Charlton Comics titles
Western (genre) comics
Comics characters introduced in 1957
Defunct American comics
1957 comics debuts
1983 comics endings
Comics about Billy the Kid